Hugh Cook (born 1942) is a Canadian novelist.

Born in The Hague, Netherlands, his family emigrated to Canada in 1950, settling in Burnaby, British Columbia.

Cook holds degrees from Calvin College, Simon Fraser University and the University of Iowa. In 1982, he joined the English faculty at Redeemer College, now Redeemer University College, in Ancaster, Ontario, teaching Canadian, American literature, and creative writing. He retired from full-time teaching in 2005 to devote time to his writing.

Cook's stories have been published in Canada's leading literary journals. His stories in Home in Alfalfa were adapted into a stage play which was performed by the Redeemer University College Theatre Arts department in the fall of 2007. Cook's novel The Homecoming Man has been translated into Dutch under the title Een Man Komt Thuis. His novel Heron River  will appear in Dutch translation in 2015 under the title De Tuin van Adam.
 
Cook lives in Hamilton, Ontario. He gives frequent readings from his work and speaks at writers' conferences.

Bibliography
Cracked Wheat and Other Stories - 1985
The Homecoming Man - 1989
Home in Alfalfa - 1998
Heron River - 2011

References

1942 births
Living people
Canadian male novelists
Writers from Hamilton, Ontario
Simon Fraser University alumni
Writers from The Hague
20th-century Canadian novelists
21st-century Canadian novelists
20th-century Canadian male writers
21st-century Canadian male writers